Prova may refer to:

 Prova, a programming language
 Prova (album), an album by Katy Garbi
 Sadia Jahan Prova, a Bangladeshi model and television actress

See also 

 Prove (disambiguation)